The Anglican Church of All Saints in Merriott, Somerset, England was built in the 13th century. It is a Grade II* listed building.

History

The church was built in the 13th century. It was modified in the late 15th or early 16th century and then was extended, as part of a Victorian restoration.  This included a new chancel and the removal of the galleries which had been erected in 1830. It was carried out in 1860 by Benjamin Ferrey. At one time the advowson was held by Muchelney Abbey.

The parish is part of the benefice of Merriott with Hinton, Dinnington and Lopen within the Diocese of Bath and Wells.

Architecture

The hamstone building has a clay tiled roof. It consist of a four-bay nave  and two-bay chancel with side aisles. The tower is supported by corner buttresses. There is a peal of six bells, the oldest of which were cast in the 1730s by the Bilbie family.

The interior fittings are from the 19th century restoration.

See also
 List of ecclesiastical parishes in the Diocese of Bath and Wells

References

Grade II* listed buildings in South Somerset
Grade II* listed churches in Somerset
Church of England church buildings in South Somerset